Mary Cordell Nesbitt (December 18, 1911 - August 1, 1979) was an American politician.

Born in Asheville, North Carolina, Nesbitt went to Buncombe County Junior College. She then received her bachelor's and master's degrees from Western Carolina University and was an educational consultant. Nesbitt served in the North Carolina House of Representatives, as a Democrat, from 1975 until her death in 1979. Her son Martin Nesbitt was appointed to fill the seat.

Notes

1911 births
1979 deaths
Democratic Party members of the North Carolina House of Representatives
Politicians from Asheville, North Carolina
University of North Carolina at Asheville alumni
Western Carolina University alumni
Women state legislators in North Carolina
20th-century American politicians
20th-century American women politicians